Timothy James Smith (born June 14, 1986) is a Canadian former professional baseball outfielder. Prior to beginning his professional career, he played college baseball at Arizona State University. Smith has also competed for the Canadian national baseball team.

Career

Amateur career
Smith attended Birchmount Park Collegiate Institute, where he was named to the High School Baseball All-Star Team by the Toronto Star after his senior year. Drafted by the New York Mets in the 21st round (614th overall) of the 2004 Major League Baseball (MLB) draft, Smith opted to go to college instead of signing. He enrolled at Midland College, a junior college, where he set school records for career average (.459), OBP (.547), slugging (.736) and steals (41). and after one season, Smith was drafted by the Milwaukee Brewers in the 17th round (505th overall) of the 2005 MLB draft, but again, he did not sign.

Smith transferred to Arizona State University, where he played college baseball for the Arizona State Sun Devils baseball team in the Pacific-10 Conference of the NCAA Division I. The Sun Devils reached the 2007 College World Series.

Professional career
Following the 2007 season, Smith was drafted by the Texas Rangers in the 7th round of the 2007 MLB draft. He was a Midwest League All-Star in 2008, winning All-Star Game Most Valuable Player honors. On September 3, 2009, the Rangers traded Smith and Manny Piña to the Kansas City Royals for Danny Gutierrez. Smith was a Texas League All-Star in 2010.

Offered the choice between serving as a backup in Class AAA or being released, Smith opted for free agency. Smith signed with the Atlanta Braves in April 2012.  In January 2013, Smith signed with the Baltimore Orioles.

International career
Smith has played for the Canadian national baseball team. In 2011, he participated in the 2011 Baseball World Cup, winning the bronze medal, and the Pan American Games, winning the gold medal. At the Pan American Games, Smith was second on the Canadian team in batting average (.350) and on-base plus slugging percentage (.985).

References

External links

1986 births
Living people
Arizona League Rangers players
Arizona League Royals players
Arizona State Sun Devils baseball players
Bakersfield Blaze players
Baseball outfielders
Baseball players at the 2011 Pan American Games
Baseball players at the 2015 Pan American Games
Canadian expatriate baseball players in the United States
Clinton LumberKings players
Frisco RoughRiders players
Lynchburg Hillcats players
Mississippi Braves players
Northwest Arkansas Naturals players
Pan American Games gold medalists for Canada
Pan American Games medalists in baseball
Spokane Indians players
Baseball players from Toronto
Winnipeg Goldeyes players
World Baseball Classic players of Canada
2013 World Baseball Classic players
Medalists at the 2015 Pan American Games
Medalists at the 2011 Pan American Games